Maria Theresia van Thielen (7 March 1640 – 11 February 1706) was a Flemish Baroque painter.

Biography

Maria van Thielen was born into an artistic patrician family. According to Cornelis de Bie in his Het Gulden Cabinet her two sisters were painters; Houbraken says she competed with her sisters Anna Maria and Francoise Katharina and was very successful. The sister Anna may well have been her aunt Anna, however, who married the painter Theodoor Rombouts. The three women learned flower painting from their father, Jan Philip van Thielen. Maria's work is in the same style as her father, and probably much of her work has been attributed to him.

She signed her works M.T.Van THIELEN.F. She painted two flower pieces in her father's style for the city hall of Mechelen, one of which is signed and dated 1664.

She became a master in the Antwerp guild of St. Luke in 1665.

References

1640 births
1706 deaths
Flemish Baroque painters
Flemish still life painters
Flemish women painters
Artists from Mechelen
Flower artists
17th-century women artists